The 2016–17 Merkur osiguranje Handball Superleague is the 11th season of the Handball League of Serbia, Serbian's top-tier handball league. A total of twelve teams contest this season's league. RK Vojvodina are the defending champions.

Format
The competition format for the 2016–17 season consists of a home-and-away double round-robin system. The first six teams qualifies for play-offs, while the last six plays for relegation. The last two teams of this relegation round are relegated.

Teams

The following 12 clubs compete in the Serbian SuperLiga during the 2016–17 season.

Regular season

Standings

Results

Championship Round 

Teams begin this round with points acquired against the five other teams of this round during the regular season :
 Vojvodina : 17 pts
 Crvena zvezda : 10 pts
 Dinamo : 10 pts
 Spartak Vojput : 8 pts
 Sloga : 8 pts
 Samot 65 : 7 pts

Relegation round 

Teams begin this round with points acquired against the five other teams of this round during the regular season :
 Rudar : 14 pts
 Metaloplastika : 13 pts
 Partizan : 12 pts
 Požarevac : 11 pts
 Morava : 6 pts
 Jugović : 4 pts

References

External links
 SuperLiga

Serbia
First League of Handball 2016-17
Handball
Handball